In chemistry, a phosphorochloridate is a class of organophosphorus compounds with the formula (RO)2P(O)Cl (R = organic substituent).  They are tetrahedral in shape, akin to regular phosphates (OP(OR)3).  They are usually colorless and sensitive toward hydrolysis. They are oxidized derivatives of phosphorochloridites, which have the formula (RO)2PCl.  A popular example is diethyl phosphorochloridate.

Synthesis and reactions
Phosphochloridites are precursors to phosphate esters:
(RO)2P(O)Cl  +  R'OH  →   (R'O)(RO)2P(O)  +  HCl
Other nucleophiles have been employed, such as azide.

References

 
Functional groups
Phosphorus halides
Phosphorus(V) compounds